In medieval Germany, the Schultheiß was the head of a municipality (akin to today's office of mayor), a Vogt or an executive official of the ruler. As official (villicus) it was his duty to order his assigned village or county (villicatio) to pay the taxes and perform the services due to the ruler. The name originates from this function: Schuld 'debt' + heißen 'to order'. Later, the title was also used for the head of a town (Stadtschultheiß) or village (Dorfschultheiß).

The office held by a Schultheiß was called Scholtisei, Scholtisse (around 1400), Schultessy, Schultissīe, Schultissei (15th century); Latinized forms: sculdasia (10th century), scultetia (13th century).

The title first appears in the Edictum Rothari of 643 AD, where it is spelled in post-Roman Latin as sculdahis. This title reappears again in the Lombard laws of Liutprand in 723 AD. The title was originally spelled in Old High German as sculdheizo and in Middle High German as Schultheize; it was Latinised as scultetus or sculteus. Alternative spellings include Schultheis, Schulte or Schulze, or in Switzerland Schultheiss. It also appears in several European languages: In Hungarian as soltész, in Slovak as šoltýs and škultét, in Italian as scoltetto and sculdascio, in Medieval Latin as sculdasius, in Polish as sołtys, in Romanian as șoltuz, and in Dutch as schout.

Modern uses 
Until as recently as 2007, Schultheiss was the title of the president of the government of the Canton of Lucerne, Switzerland.

Schultheiß is also the basis for one of the most common German surnames, existing in many variations such as Schulz, Schultz, Scholz, etc., corresponding to the local variants of the pronunciation of the office. It also produced surnames in a number of other European cultures: see Schultheiss (surname) for a table.

In Poland, sołtys is the name given to the elected head of a rural subdivision (usually a village, or part of a large village) known as a sołectwo.

See also 
 similar medieval offices: Vogt,  Villicus, Ealdorman
 Reichsvogt, nearly equivalent office in medieval Switzerland
 Sheriff, the equivalent office in medieval England
 Patel, the equivalent office in medieval Gujarat

References

Heads of local government
German feudalism
German words and phrases